Richard Pearson (born Ulcombe, Kent 18 October 1970) is an English former professional footballer. He made 9 appearances in The Football League for Gillingham. In 1990 he left Gillingham and joined Southern League club Ashford Town and played there over two spells.

References

1970 births
English Football League players
English footballers
Gillingham F.C. players
Ashford United F.C. players
Living people
People from Ulcombe
Association football defenders